Caruso sauce or salsa Caruso is a warm sauce made of cream, ham, cheese, beef extract, and mushrooms. Recipes may also include nuts or onions. It is served with pasta (typically cappelletti).

History
Caruso sauce was first created in the 1950s in Uruguay, by Raymundo Monti of the restaurant 'Mario and Alberto', located at the intersection of Constituyente and Tacuarembó Streets in Montevideo. Monti wanted to create a new recipe following the current traditions of Italian cuisine. The dish was named in honor of the famous Neapolitan tenor Enrico Caruso (1873–1921) who was a popular figure in South America during his tours of the 1910s.

The sauce was originally thought to be a variant of bechamel but its flavor is distinctly different. Several culinary seminars referred to Caruso sauce as "the new invention" and it gained international culinary recognition. In recent decades, the sauce has become increasingly popular in most South American and Western European countries.

Due to the shared cultural background existing between Uruguay and Argentina, it is not unusual to encounter Caruso sauce on restaurant menus in Buenos Aires. It can even be found in some Brazilian restaurants.

See also
 List of sauces

References

External links

Caruso sauce recipe A Big Slice.com
Uruguayan dishes in Mi Montevideo (Spanish)

Uruguayan cuisine
Sauces
Cultural depictions of Enrico Caruso
Pork dishes
Milk dishes
Cheese dishes